Katanda (Katan Tuu) is a rural locality (a selo) and the administrative centre of Katandinskoye Rural Settlement of Ust-Koksinsky District, the Altai Republic, Russia. The population was 905 as of 2016. There are 16 streets.

Geography 
Katanda is located in the Katanga steppe, 50 km southeast of Ust-Koksa (the district's administrative centre) by road. Tyungur is the nearest rural locality.

References 

Rural localities in Ust-Koksinsky District